Nancy Jane Ditz (born June 25, 1954 in San Jose, California) is a former American long-distance runner who is a United States national champion in the marathon. Ditz competed in the marathon at the 1988 Summer Olympics.

In her debut marathon, Ditz won the 1982 San Francisco Marathon (2:44:34). She also set a course record at the 1985 California International Marathon with a time of 2:31:36. Nancy worked to promote the 2009 Los Angeles Marathon with fellow Olympians Rod Dixon and Ed Eyestone.

Nancy Ditz Mosbacher is a member of the 1988 United States Olympic team. She finished first among American (17th overall) in the Athletics at the 1988 Summer Olympics – Women's marathon. Ditz Mosbacher graduated from Stanford while competing as a diver and crew member, and did not begin running competitively until age 25. Ditz's husband, Bruce Mosbacher, was a goalkeeper on the Stanford soccer team; their son, Jack Mosbacher, was a member of Stanford's baseball team; and daughter, Emily Mosbacher, was a member of the Harvard Women's Soccer Team.

She quickly found herself naturally talented in the sport. In 1982, she won her debut marathon, the San Francisco Marathon in 2:44:34. In between her debut and making the Olympic team, Ditz Mosbacher won numerous road races, including the U.S. National Marathon Championships (1985), the Los Angeles Marathon (1986, 1987), the San Francisco Marathon (1982), the Oakland Marathon (1983), and Bay to Breakers (1984). In 1985, she set a course record at the California International Marathon with a time of 2:31:36. From the 1988 Summer Olympics, Ditz Mosbacher has been a color commentator for NBC and CBS Sports through the early 2000s. She has covered events such as the 1996 Olympic Marathon Trials, the 1988 and 1989 NCAA Track and Field Championships, and the 1994 Examiner Bay to Breakers earning her a spot in the 2019 Road Runners Club of America Hall of Fame Class.

Nancy has served on the boards of Castilleja School, USA Track & Field, World TEAM Sports, the Track & Field Foundation and the USOC Paralympic Advisory Committee (PAC), as well as several boards and committees at Stanford University.

Achievements

References

External links
 
 
 

1954 births
Living people
Castilleja School alumni
American female long-distance runners
American female marathon runners
Athletes (track and field) at the 1988 Summer Olympics
Olympic track and field athletes of the United States
Track and field athletes from California
21st-century American women